Carl Johan Severin Steen (1825–1874) was a Norwegian politician.

He was born in Lom, but eventually settled in Førde. He was mayor of the municipality for some time, and was elected to the Parliament of Norway in 1874. He was also a jurist and later county auditor.

References
Carl Johan Severin Steen at NRK Sogn og Fjordane County Encyclopedia 

1825 births
1874 deaths
People from Lom, Norway
People from Førde
Norwegian jurists
Members of the Storting
Mayors of places in Sogn og Fjordane